The Port of Pozzallo is the major port of the province of Ragusa on the Mediterranean coast of Sicily and is one of the most important harbours on the island.
The port was initially designed for a volume of goods of only 500.000 tons a year but today it has risen to over 1.500.000 tons. It is well placed for connections to north Africa.

History
The first steps in construction were taken by the authorities in 1935 in Pozzallo but the first structure was not built until 1960 when a pier was built for petrol products. The late 1980s saw building works started which were not completed until well into the 1990s.

Passenger service
There is a catamaran service to Malta which runs throughout the year. The journey takes 90 minutes.

Statistics

* figures in tonnes

Ports and harbours of Italy
Province of Ragusa
Transport in Sicily
Buildings and structures in the Province of Ragusa